Mamykin is a Russian masculine surname, its feminine counterpart is Mamykina. Notable people with the surname include:

Aleksei Mamykin (1936–2011), Russian football player and coach
Matvey Mamykin (born 1994), Russian cyclist

Russian-language surnames